Robert Phinisee (born October 13, 1999) is an American college basketball player for Cincinnati of the American Athletic Conference. He previously played for Indiana. He attended McCutcheon High School and was ranked as one of the highest prospects in the state of Indiana.

High school career
Phinisee attended McCutcheon High School. As a freshman, Phinisee averaged 6.6 points, 1.8 rebounds, and 2.5 assists. In his sophomore year, he averaged 19.0 points, 4.3 rebounds, and 6.2 assists per game helping the Mavericks to a 28–4 overall record and an undefeated 8–0 conference record. The team advanced to the Class 4A state championship game, where they lost 59–62 to New Albany. In his junior year, he averaged 21.7 points, 5.9 rebounds, and 6.8 assists per game. The season ended with a state regional loss 61–68 to Carmel, resulting in a 23–3 overall record. As part of his dominant senior journey, Phinisee was able to tie the all-time scoring record at McCutcheon (set in 2002 by Avery Sheets who went on to play at Butler) when he hit a 3-pointer at the buzzer to end the first quarter in the game against Harrison on December 15, 2017. He went on to score a total of 50 points that game to make the record his own. On February 16, 2018 Phinisee and his teammates clinched the North Central Conference title (eventually going 9–0). Phinisee scored 34 points against Muncie Central, despite a broken nose. The season came to an early close with a loss against Zionsville's Eagles, 50–60, leaving the Mavericks with an overall record of 20–5. Phinisee scored 33 points, bringing his total to 2,023. He averaged 29.3 points, 6.8 rebounds, and 5.9 assists per game.

Recruiting
Phinisee was recruited in high school by numerous high profile schools, including scholarship offers from in-state schools Indiana, Purdue, and Butler, and out-of-state schools Georgetown, Virginia, and Xavier. On August 19, 2017, Phinisee announced his commitment to Indiana.

College career
Phinisee suffered a concussion at the end of December 2018, missing three games. He averaged 6.9 points, 3.3 rebounds and 2.9 assists per game as a freshman. He suffered an ankle injury in December 2019. Phinisee averaged 7.3 points, 3.4 assists, and 2.5 rebounds per game as a sophomore. As a junior, Phinisee averaged 7.1 points, 2.9 assists, and 2.3 rebounds per game. On January 20, 2022, he scored a career-high 20 points including the go-ahead 3-pointer with 16.5 seconds left in a 68-65 victory over Purdue. On January 28, Phinisee was ruled out due to plantar fasciitis.

On April 20, 2022, Phinisee announced he was transferring to Cincinnati.

Career statistics

College

|-
| style="text-align:left;"| 2018–19
| style="text-align:left;"| Indiana
| 32 || 29 || 27.3 || .361 || .310 || .660 || 3.3 || 2.9 || 1.1 || 0.1 || 6.8
|-
| style="text-align:left;"| 2019–20
| style="text-align:left;"| Indiana
| 27 || 16 || 23.2 || .374 || .333 || .725 || 2.5 || 3.4 || 1.0 || 0.2 || 7.3
|-
| style="text-align:left;"| 2020–21
| style="text-align:left;"| Indiana
| 27 || 24 || 27.1 || .347 || .260 || .638 || 2.3 || 2.9 || .8 || 0.4 || 7.1
|-
| style="text-align:left;"| 2021–22
| style="text-align:left;"| Indiana
| 25 || 0 || 18.3 || .312 || .264 || .412 || 2.1 || 1.7 || .8 || 0.2 || 4.5
|- class="sortbottom"
| style="text-align:center;" colspan="2"| Career
| 111 || 69 || 24.2 || .351 || .290 || .649 || 2.6 || 2.8 || 0.9 || 0.2 || 6.5

Personal life
Rob is the son of Tanika Phinisee and has three brothers, Alantae, Charles, and Joe. According to his brothers, who also played at McCutcheon High School, his potential began to be recognized when he played alongside Charles in the AAU. His skills and abilities led him to a spot on Indiana Elite's AAU team.

References

External links
Indiana Hoosiers bio

1999 births
Living people
American men's basketball players
Basketball players from Indiana
Indiana Hoosiers men's basketball players
Point guards
Sportspeople from Lafayette, Indiana